Cavicularin is a natural phenolic secondary metabolite isolated from the liverwort Cavicularia densa. This macrocycle is unusual because it was the first compound isolated from nature displaying optical activity solely due to the presence of planar chirality and axial chirality. The specific rotation for (+)-cavicularin is +168.2°. It is also a very strained molecule. The para-substituted phenol ring is bent about 15° out of planarity, adopting a somewhat boat-like geometry. This type of  angle strain in aromatic compounds is normally reserved for synthetic cyclophanes.

The liverwort was obtained from Mount Ishizuchi in the district of Shikoku. The material was dried for one day, ground to a powder and 5 grams were refluxed in methanol for 4 months [reference needed] to yield 2.5 mg (0.049%) of cavicularin after column chromatography and preparative TLC.

Total synthesis 
In 2005 and again in 2011, the compound was prepared by total synthesis together with the unstrained compound riccardin C. In 2013, several other syntheses were reported for it and a racemic synthesis.

References 

Dihydrostilbenoids
Phenanthrenoids
Macrocycles
Diphenyl ethers
Total synthesis
Cyclophanes